Sarrià Stadium (in Catalan: Estadi de Sarrià ; in Spanish: Estadio de Sarrià) was a football stadium in Barcelona, Catalonia, Spain. The stadium was the home of RCD Espanyol from 1923 to 1997, and was located in the district of Sarrià.

Beginning 
The stadium was named after the road in which it was constructed, which linked Barcelona and Sarrià.  Construction began on 31 December 1922 under the supervision of architect Matías Colmenares, and the cost was 170,000 pesetas. The initial forecast capacity was for 40,000 spectators, but due to the bankruptcy of the construction company the initial capacity was only for 10,000 spectators.

The opening game was played on 18 February 1923 with RCD Espanyol beating UE Sants 4–1, the first goal scored by Vicenç Tonijuan.  In 1929 the club won its first Cup in Spain. On 10 February, at the stadium, 'Pitus' Prats scored the first goal of the first Spanish league title. However, although the club won several Catalan Championships they had to wait until 1940 before winning their second cup in Spain.

Successive enlargements 
In 1948, Espanyol under club president Paco Saenz, repurchased the stadium, which until then belonged to Riva family, for 5 million pesetas.

In 1951 terracing behind the south goal was demolished, and a new grandstand was built which was overlaid in 1956. In 1960 floodlights were installed.

During the 1960s, several outstanding players such as Cayetano Re, Martial, Rodilla, Jose Maria and Peck played at the Sarrià Stadium, but especially noteworthy were Ladislao Kubala (1963–1964) and Alfredo Di Stefano (1964–1967) who finished his career there.

Manuel Meler, the president at the time, completed the southern tier raised above the new gallery, installed the lower side and reconstructed the north stand, all in twelve years.

The 1980s and 1990s

1982 World Cup 
The Sarrià stadium hosted three games of the 1982 FIFA World Cup, with the three matches of Group C in the second round round robin matches, with three of the favourites for the cup playing in this group: Argentina, Brazil, and eventual champions Italy. The key game was the third, in which Italy defeated Brazil 3-2, in a match regarded as one of the best ever played at a World Cup. The ground was full to capacity for the decisive matches. Jonathan Wilson, writing about the Brazil v Italy match in 2012, said that its "epic feel" was enhanced by the ground being packed.

Other events 
The stadium held the first leg of the 1988 UEFA Cup Final, in which Espanyol played Bayer Leverkusen.

Pink Floyd performed at the stadium during their A Momentary Lapse of Reason Tour" on 20 July 1988 and three days later George Michael performed at the stadium with his Faith World Tour.

Sting performed at the stadium during The Soul Cages Tour on 12 June 1991.

The venue hosted five football matches at the 1992 Summer Olympics.

Demolition and sale 
Espanyol's financial problems forced the company to sell the stadium to property developers. The last game played in Sarrià was against Valencia on 21 June 1997.  Espanyol won 3-2 and the last goal was scored by visiting defender Iván Campo. The club then played at the Estadi Olímpic Lluís Companys on Montjuïc until 2009, when it moved to the Estadi Cornellà-El Prat, located between Cornellà de Llobregat and El Prat de Llobregat.

External links
Estadios de Espana

References

RCD Espanyol
Defunct sports venues in Catalonia
Defunct football venues in Spain
Football venues in Barcelona
1982 FIFA World Cup stadiums
Sarrià-Sant Gervasi
Venues of the 1992 Summer Olympics
Olympic football venues
Multi-purpose stadiums in Spain
Sports venues completed in 1923
1923 establishments in Spain